The Lochaber axe (Gaëlic: tuagh-chatha) is a type of poleaxe that was used almost exclusively in Scotland. It was usually mounted on a staff about five feet long.

Design 

The Lochaber axe is first recorded in 1501, as an "old Scottish batale ax of Lochaber fasoun".

The weapon is very similar to the Jedburgh axe, although the crescent blade of the former is larger and heavier than that of the latter. The Lochaber axe took many incarnations, all of them having a few elements in common. It was a heavy weapon, used by infantry for a defense against cavalry and as a pike against infantry.

Like most other polearms of the time, it consisted of two parts: shaft and blade. The blade might be attached in two places and often had a sharp point coming off the top. In addition a hook (or cleek) was attached to the back of the blade. A butt spike was included as a counterweight to the heavy axe head. Langets were incorporated down each side of the shaft to prevent the head from being cut off.

The Lochaber axe had the virtue of being a cheap weapon that could be easily made by a blacksmith. They could be used to arm men who lacked a broadsword or a firearm. Hundreds were hastily made to equip the Earl of Mar's levie troops during the Jacobite rising of 1715. A few were carried by Jacobite troops during the early part of the Jacobite rising of 1745. Although by the end of the rising, almost all Jacobites were armed with muskets and bayonets.

Use 

In hand-to-hand combat, the axe, in common with other polearms such as the halberd, has a spike on the end, to be used on close combat in a thrusting motion. The axe on the side, coupled with the long pole, delivered a powerful blow to infantry or dismounted cavalry.. The example in the Edinburgh Great Hall Museum shows a substantial rear-facing hook, for catching/pulling.

For lochaber axes used by the city guards of Edinburgh, the hook is almost level with the top of the staff, making them useless as a means to catch a moving object. These hooks, however, may have been used to hang the weapons in the guard room.

See also 

 Bardiche

Notes

References 

 
 

Polearms
Blade weapons
Axes
Weapons of Scotland
Medieval polearms